Helen Althaus Park (formerly Watershed Park) is a  public park in Troutdale, Oregon, United States. Named after former city council member Helen Althaus, the park has a large underground reservoir which has been covered with a basketball court. 

In 2015, Oregon Fish and Wildlife was notified of the presence of a cougar in the park.

References

External links

 

Parks in Multnomah County, Oregon
Troutdale, Oregon